Mesophleps oxycedrella is a moth of the family Gelechiidae. It is found in Spain, Portugal, southern France, Italy and on Sicily the Canary Islands.

The wingspan is 6.5–14 mm. The forewings are light yellow to ochre with distinct dark brown markings. Adults emerge in early July.

The larvae feed on the fruit of Juniperus oxycedrus, Juniperus phoeniceus and Juniperus macrocarpus. Young larvae bore into the fleshy part of the berry in mid-August. It overwinters there and feeds and grows again in early spring. Larvae are full-grown in March or April and they leave the fruit and descend to the ground on a silken thread to pupate. Full-grown larvae are 10–12 mm. They have a yellowish white or amber body with a pale ochre head.

References

Moths described in 1871
Mesophleps
Moths of Europe